RapidSVN is a cross-platform Subversion client. It is released under the GNU General Public License. The current version of RapidSVN does not support the SVN "blame" command.

Issues on Windows 
 RapidSVN doesn't come with an SSH client so the user must install a client, for example the plink.exe that comes with PuTTY.
 When one specifies the path to one's ssh client in the Subversion configuration file, the Unix style should be followed.

See also 

 Subversion - an open-source application used for revision control
 Comparison of Subversion clients

References

External links
 

Free software programmed in C++
Free software programmed in C
Apache Subversion
Cross-platform software
Software that uses wxWidgets
Version control GUI tools